Sea Breaker is a fifth generation precision-guided, autonomous, long-range anti ship and land attack missile system. It is being designed and developed by Rafael Advanced Defence Systems. It can be launched from either ships or land.
 The air launched version of this missile is known as Ice Breaker.

See also 
 Harpoon
 Neptune
 Kh-35
 AGM-158C LRASM
 Exocet
 Sea Eagle
 Naval Strike Missile
 RBS-15
 Otomat
 C-802
 Type 80 Air-to-Ship Missile
 Type 88 Surface-to-Ship Missile
 Type 90 Ship-to-Ship Missile
 Type 93 Air-to-Ship Missile
 SSM-700K Haeseong
 Atmaca
 Hsiung Feng II
 Hsiung Feng III

References

 
Surface-to-surface missiles
 
Guided missiles of Israel
Military equipment introduced in the 2020s